Amblyzancla araeoptila is a moth of the family Yponomeutidae. It is found in Australia.

External links
Australian Faunal Directory

Yponomeutidae
Moths of Australia
Moths described in 1939